Paschalis Terzis (born 24 April 1949) is a popular Greek singer.

Biography
Terzis was born in Pylaia, a suburb of Thessaloniki. In his early teens, he began to sing with friends, some of whom helped him in his career. After moving to Athens, he began performing as a back-up vocalist in popular music centres, with famous Greek singers of the 1960s, including Tzeni Vanou.

Since the 1980s, Terzis has recorded several albums, several of which remain popular to the present day. Even now, he is a very popular singer, making new albums, performing on famous music scenes of Athens and Thessaloniki, and appearing on talk shows.

In the winter period 2006–2007, Paschalis Terzis had a music program with Elena Paparizou and Nino Ksipolitas at Iera Odos. His daughter Yianna Terzi is also a singer.

Discography

Studio albums

Live albums

References

Living people
20th-century Greek male singers
Greek laïko singers
Minos EMI artists
1949 births
Singers from Thessaloniki